Michael Cacoyannis (Michalis Kakogiannis; 11 June 1922 – 25 July 2011), sometimes credited as Michael Yannis, was a Greek Cypriot theatre and film director, writer, producer, and actor. 

Much of his work was rooted in classical texts, especially those of the Greek tragedian Euripides. His most acclaimed work is the 1964 film Zorba the Greek, an adaptation of Nikos Kazantzakis' novel of the same name. He also directed the 1983 Broadway revival of the musical based on the film. In addition to directing, he also wrote, produced, translated, and designed dozens of stage play and opera productions.

He was nominated for an Academy Award five times, a record for any Cypriot film artist. He received Best Picture, Best Director, and Best Adapted Screenplay nominations for Zorba the Greek, and two nominations in the Best Foreign Language Film category for Electra (1962) and Iphigenia (1977). He received many other international accolades, including the Technical Grand Prize from the Cannes Film Festival, as well as six Palme d'Or nominations.

Life and career

Cacoyannis was born in 1922 in Limassol, Cyprus. His father, Sir Panayotis Loizou Cacoyannis, had been knighted in the 1936 Birthday Honours by the United Kingdom government for public services in Cyprus. His sister was the politician Stella Soulioti.

In 1939, he was sent by his father to London to become a lawyer. He graduated from law school and joined the BBC World Service, soon taking charge of its new Cyprus Service. His deputy was Beba Clerides, sister of the RAF fighter pilot and future President of Cyprus, Glafkos Clerides. However, after producing Greek-language programmes for the BBC World Service during World War II, he ended up at the Old Vic school, and enjoyed a brief stage career there under the name Michael Yannis before he began working on films. After having trouble finding a directing job in the British film industry, Cacoyannis moved to Greece, and in 1953 he made his first film, Windfall in Athens.

He was offered the chance to direct Elizabeth Taylor and Marlon Brando in the film Reflections in a Golden Eye, but he declined.  Between 1959 and 1967, he was in a relationship with Yael Dayan, a progressive Israeli politician and author. Cacoyannis translated some of Shakespeare's plays Antony and Cleopatra, Coriolanus and Hamlet into Greek, and Euripides' play The Bacchae into English. 

Cacoyannis died on 25 July 2011 in Athens, aged 89.

Filmography

 The Cherry Orchard (1999): director, screenwriter, producer
 Up, Down and Sideways (Pano kato ke plagios) (1993): director, screenwriter, producer
 Sweet Country (Glykeia patrida) (1986): director, screenwriter, producer
 Iphigenia (1977): director, screenwriter
 Attilas '74 (1975): director, producer
 The Story of Jacob and Joseph, director
 The Trojan Women (1971): director, screenwriter, producer
 The Day the Fish Came Out (Otan ta psaria vgikan sti steria) (1967): director, screenwriter, producer
 Zorba the Greek (Alexis Zorbas)  (1964): director, screenwriter, producer
 Electra (1962): director, screenwriter, producer
 The Wastrel (Il Relitto) (1961): director, screenwriter
 Eroica (Our Last Spring) (1960): director, screenwriter, producer
 A Matter of Dignity (To telefteo psemma) (1957): director, screenwriter, producer
 A Girl in Black (To koritsi me ta mavra) (1956): director, screenwriter
 Stella (1955): director, screenwriter, producer
 Windfall in Athens (Kyriakatiko xypnima) (1954): director, screenwriter

Bibliography

 Cacoyiannis, Michael. Diladi. Athens: Kastaniotis, 1990.

Awards and nominations 

Cannes Film Festival
1954 : Golden Palm for "Windfall in Athens" – nominated
1955 : Golden Palm for "Stella" – nominated
1956 : Golden Palm for "A Girl in Black" – nominated
1957 : Golden Palm for "A Matter of Dignity" – nominated
1961 : Golden Palm for "The Wastrel" – nominated
1962 : Golden Palm for "Elektra" – nominated
1962 : Grand Jury Prize for "Elektra" – won
1962 : Technical Award for "Elektra" – won
1977 : Golden Palm for "Iphigenia" – nominated

Berlin International Film Festival
1960 : Golden Bear for "Our Last Spring" – nominated
1963 : David O. Selznick Award for "Elektra" – won

Academy Award (Oscar)
1963 : Best Foreign Language Film for "Elektra" – nominated
1964 : Best Picture for "Zorba the Greek" – nominated
1964 : Best Director for "Zorba the Greek" – nominated
1964 : Best Adapted Screenplay for "Zorba the Greek" – nominated
1977 : Best Foreign Language Film for "Iphigenia" – nominated

Golden Globe
1956 : Best Foreign Language Film for "Stella" – won
1957 : Best Foreign Language Film for "A Girl in Black" – won
1965 : Best Director for "Zorba the Greek – nominated

British Academy Award (BAFTA)
1966 : Best Film for "Zorba the Greek" – nominated
1966 : UN Award for "Zorba the Greek" – nominated

New York Film Critics
1964 : Best Film for "Zorba the Greek" – nominated
1964 : Best Director for "Zorba the Greek" – nominated
1964 : Best Screenplay for "Zorba the Greek" – nominated

David di Donatello Award
1964 : Special Plaque for "Zorba the Greek" – won

Thessaloniki Film Festival
1960 : Special Contribution Award – won
1961 : Best Director for "Our Last Spring" – won
1962 : Best Film for "Elektra" – won
1962 : Best Director for "Elektra" – won
1977 : Best Film for "Iphigenia" – won
1999 : Union of Film and Television Technicians Award for "The Cherry Orchard" – won

Moscow Film Festival
1956 : Silver Medal for "A Girl in Black" – Won

Edinburgh Film Festival
1954 : Diploma of Merit for "Windfall in Athens" – won
1962 : Diploma of Merit for "Elektra" – won

Montreal World Film Festival
1999 : Special Contribution Award – won

Jerusalem Film Festival
1999 : Lifetime Achievement Award – won

Cairo International Film Festival
2001 : Lifetime Achievement Award – won

References

Further reading

 Festival Kinimatografou Thessalonikis. Michalis Kakogiannis. Athens: Kastaniotis, 1995.
 Georgakas, Dan. "From Stella to Iphigenia: The Woman-Centered Films of Michael Cacoyannis." Cineaste 30(2), 2005: pp. 24–31. 
 "Personality of the Month." Films and Filming, July 1960: p. 5.
 Siafkos, Christos. Michalis Kakogiannis: Se Proto Plano. Athens: Psychogios, 2009.

External links.

1922 births
2011 deaths
People from Limassol
Greek Cypriot people
Greek film directors
Cypriot film directors
Cypriot screenwriters
Cypriot film producers
Alumni of the Royal Central School of Speech and Drama
Members of Gray's Inn
Cypriot emigrants to England
Cypriot emigrants to Greece
Translators of William Shakespeare
Translators of Ancient Greek texts
Greek–English translators
Cypriot theatre people